CoroWare, Inc. is a publicly held company based in Woodinville, Washington.

History 
CoroWare was founded in 2003 by David Hyams and Lloyd Spencer and joined the Technology Collaborative of Pittsburgh, Pennsylvania in 2005. In 2006 CoroWare became a subsidiary of the public corporation Innova Holdings, later named Innova Robotics & Automation. In 2008, Innova became CoroWare, Inc. and CoroWare Technologies continued to operate as a fully owned subsidiary of CoroWare, Inc.

On October 28, 2016, the company ceased all operations, citing insufficient cash reserves, accumulated tax and debt liabilities, and "certain recent events resulting from the Notice of Default from YA Global Investments".

On February 13, 2018, CoroWare announced that the company is dramatically changing its strategic focus and will focus its business on the natural resources sector through joint venture partnerships.  The company is in the process of transitioning itself into a global natural resources company with a focus on coal production and new technologies and products derived from coal.

On February 8, 2021, CoroWare announced, via a website update, that they have begun their early renovation stages of transitioning itself into a resource reclamation company with a focus on hydrogen and carbon technologies.

Products 
CoroBot - A four-wheeled robot was released in March 2007. It is a four-wheeled robot that has an onboard mini-ITX computer and an optional 4 DOF arm.

See also 
Cobot (collaborative robot)

References

External links
"Robots on the March - Part Two"
"The CoroBot Unmanned Mobile PC"
"CoroBots and Microsoft Robotics Studio at Vassar"

Technology companies established in 2003
Companies traded over-the-counter in the United States
Companies based in Kirkland, Washington